Sediq Zehi (also Romanized as Şedīq Zehī; also known as Şaddīqzī and Şeddīq Zā’ī) is a village in Polan Rural District, Polan District, Chabahar County, Sistan and Baluchestan Province, Iran. At the 2006 census, its population was 1,632, in 271 families.

References 

Populated places in Chabahar County